The 2011–12 Djurgårdens IF Hockey season is Djurgården's 36th season in the Swedish elite league, Elitserien. The regular season began on away ice on September 15, 2011 against HV71 and concluded on March 6, 2012 also on away ice against HV71.

Djurgården finished 11th in the regular season and were therefore forced to play in the 2012 Kvalserien to survive in the highest division, marking the club's first Kvalserien appearance in 30 years. The Kvalserien was played between 15 March and 6 April 2012. Djurgården failed to stay in the highest division and went on to play in the second-tier league HockeyAllsvenskan for the 2012–13 season.

Pre-season

European Trophy

Djurgården's 2011–12 pre-season included the international tournament European Trophy. Djurgården were placed in the north division along with Slavia Praha, Sparta Praha, Jokerit, HIFK and Luleå HF. Additional games were also played against Red Bull Salzburg, KalPa and Linköpings HC. Djurgården started off successfully with four straight wins, before losing the fifth game in overtime away against HIFK (although Djurgården came back from a 0–3 deficit to tie the game). However, the club lost the three remaining games. The game against Luleå ended with a bench-clearing brawl, which led to three Djurgården players and two Luleå players receiving a game misconduct penalty. After losing the last game against Linköping, Djurgården had to rely on Luleå losing their last game to qualify for the playoffs. Luleå won their game, and Djurgården were subsequently eliminated.

Standings

Game log

Stats

Players

Goalkeepers

Regular season

Summary
Djurgården set off to meet HV71 away in the Elitserien premier on 15 September. The game was however overshadowed by the 2011 Lokomotiv Yaroslavl plane crash where Swedish former HV71 goaltender Stefan Liv and the entire Lokomotiv Yaroslavl team were killed. A one-minute silence was held before the game. The game ended in a 2–1 Djurgården victory after Pontus Åberg scored the game-winning goal, which was also his first Elitserien goal.

Two days later the club returned to Stockholm for their first home game of the season against Modo. The Hovet arena was sold out, but Modo gained the upper hand and ultimately won 4–1.
The first Stockholm derby against AIK was played on 20 September. The first period began with AIK scoring the opening goal after seven minutes, and Djurgården decided to take a timeout. The first period ended 1–0 in AIK's favour, but Djurgården quickly turned the game around with three goals in three minutes in the beginning of the second period. In the end, Djurgården won 4–2 in front of an outsold Ericsson Globe.

Winger Jimmie Ölvestad received a game misconduct penalty in the third round game against Luleå HF, after dealing a check to the head on Luleå's Mattias Persson, which caused him to suffer a concussion. Ölvestad was subsequently suspended for three games and had to pay a 15,000 SEK fine. Luleå came out on top with a 5–2 win.

1997 IIHF Hall of Fame inductee and eight-time Swedish Champion with Djurgården Sven Tumba died at the age of 80 on 1 October. Djurgården had previously retired number five in his honour. Djurgården was scheduled to play against Elitserien newcomer Växjö Lakers the same day and, as a result of his death, a ceremony was held, including a one-minute silence before the game. The 2–1 victory against Växjö was Djurgården's first at the regular home arena Hovet this season.

After winning the 13 October home game 4–1 against Linköpings HC, as well as having 17 points after the first eleven games, Djurgården began a negative period of losses. Although only getting three regulation-time losses—all of them at the home arena Hovet—Djurgården's two wins came in shootouts. After only getting six points between 15 October–3 November, Djurgården took a long-waited regulation-time win on 5 November by beating Timrå IK 3–0 at home. Despite the negative period spanning over three weeks, 26 points in the first nineteen games was just two points less than Djurgården's previous season start. Centre Mika Zibanejad returned to Djurgården after playing nine games in the NHL with the Ottawa Senators. He made his comeback in the shootout loss against Frölunda HC on 1 November.

Following a one-week break, Djurgården resumed the season with the second derby game of the season against AIK on 14 November. Djurgården were dressed as the away team. In the game, Djurgården were shutout 0–5 and recorded their biggest derby loss since 28 December 2000 (5–0 to AIK), as well as their first derby loss since 4 November 2010 (5–2 to AIK). Before the derby loss against AIK on 14 November, Djurgården had won the five most recent derby games against AIK. However, Djurgården quickly bounced back two days later with a 5–1 win at Hovet against Färjestad. Jan Ednertz, the CEO of Djurgården Hockey AB, announced that he would leave the Djurgården organization after the 2011–12 season on 21 November. Djurgården Hockey AB is the organization which handles the elite team within Djurgårdens IF Hockey.

On 23 December 2011, Djurgården knocked AIK back by winning the third Stockholm derby of the season 3–2 in front of an outsold Ericsson Globe carrying 13,850 spectators. As a result, Djurgården climbed back to a playoff spot, placing seventh in the league with 43 points.

On 12 January 2012, in a 2–3 overtime loss against Frölunda, Marcus Nilson punched a linesman in the arm while trying to reach Jari Tolsa after a goal by Frölunda. As a result, Nilson was suspended for 2 games.

On 24 January 2012, former five-time Djurgården Swedish champion Charles Berglund's No. 2 jersey was retired and raised to the rafters in Hovet prior to a game against Färjestad. Djurgården took a 2–1 win in a shootout.

After only getting 10 points in January and falling down below a playoff spot, Djurgården decided to change the coaching staff. Head coach Hardy Nilsson and assistant coach Mikael Johansson were fired, and were replaced by the then J-20 coaching staff consisting of Tony Zabel as head coach and Nichlas Falk as assistant coach. Hans Särkijärvi took over as head coach of the J-20 team.

These changes did not improve the situation, as Djurgården were now seated in one of the two spots for the relegation series Kvalserien. Following four victories in five games, Djurgården had everything in their hands to avoid a Kvalserien spot going into the final round of the regular season on 6 March. Djurgården needed a win against HV71 to secure play in Elitserien for the 2012–13 season, but after losing 1–2, Djurgården had to rely on a regulation loss for Linköping. Linköping, however, played a 4–4 tie against Modo and surpassed Djurgården and put them in the 2012 Kvalserien. As a result, Djurgården once again modified the staff as Charles Berglund went in as head coach while Tony Zabel now went down and became assistant coach.

Standings

Game log

Kvalserien

Summary
Djurgården started the Kvalserien good with victories in two of the first three games. But, Djurgården would then round up three consecutive losses, two of which came against Elitserien rivals Timrå IK. After only collecting six points in the first six games, Djurgården used their last hopes and won 4–2 against Örebro HK. Going to the eighth game, Djurgården were most likely forced to defeat Leksands IF in order to keep their Elitserien dreams alive. Djurgården lost 0–2 and, because Rögle BK defeated BIK Karlskoga, ended a 35-year run of consecutive seasons in the top division. As a result, Djurgården would spend the 2012–13 season in the second-tier division HockeyAllsvenskan.

Standings

Game log

Statistics

Players

Goaltenders

Transfers

References

2011-12
2011–12 Elitserien season